Berea High School is the name of two high schools in the United States:
Berea High School (Ohio)
Berea High School (South Carolina)